The Samsung Galaxy Note 3 Neo (also known as the Galaxy Note 3 Lite) is an Android phablet smartphone produced by Samsung Electronics. The Galaxy Note 3 Neo was unveiled by Samsung Poland on February 1, 2014, with its worldwide release later in that month. Serving as a lower priced version of the Samsung Galaxy Note 3, the Note 3 Neo was designed to have the same lighter, more upscale design than previous iterations of the Galaxy series (with a plastic leather backing and faux metallic bezel) first supported by its bigger sibling, and to expand upon the stylus and multi-tasking oriented functionality in its software, which includes the new navigation wheel for pen-enabled apps, along with pop-up apps and expanded multi-window functionality, while lacking more sophisticated functionality such as 1080p video recording and USB 2.0 port.

Specifications

Hardware 
The Galaxy Note 3 Neo's design was intended to carry the same upscale, "premium" look with the new generation of Samsung devices. Although it carries a similarly polycarbonate-oriented design to other recent Samsung devices, the Galaxy Note 3 Neo has a faux metallic bezel and a rear cover made of plastic leather with faux stitching. Two LTE versions of the Galaxy Note 3 Neo (including one Duos 3G model) uses a 1.6 GHz quad-core Snapdragon 400 chip, i.e., the SM-N7509V, SM-N7506V and SM-N7502 (Duos 3G). Several Korean versions use 2.26 GHz quad-core Snapdragon 800 chip called SM-N750K, SM-N750L and SM-N750S. The other versions, including the international 3G models and some 4G LTE models, use a hexa-core Exynos 5260, consisting of two 1.7 GHz Cortex-A15 cores and four 1.3 GHz Cortex-A7 cores, i.e., SM-N7507, SM-N7500Q, SM-N7505L, SM-N7505, SM-N750. The device also includes 2 GB of RAM, a 5.5-inch 720p Super AMOLED display, an 8-megapixel rear-facing camera capable of filming videos in 720p at 60 fps, 1080p at 30 fps and 4K resolution at 30 fps (for only 5 mins, Snapdragon 800 model only), 16 or 32 GB of internal storage, and a 3100 mAh battery.

As with other Galaxy Note series devices, the Galaxy Note 3 Neo ships with an S Pen stylus, which has been updated to use a more symmetrical shape. The Galaxy Note 3 Neo reverted to the conventional connection of USB 2.0, in order to save costs.

The Galaxy Note 3 Neo was first made available in black, white, and green colors. Samsung is poised to introduce more color schemes for selected markets.

Software 
The Galaxy Note 3 Neo comes with Android 4.4.2 "KitKat"  and Samsung's proprietary TouchWiz user interface and software. Additional pen-oriented features have been added to the Note 3 Neo's software; removing the stylus from its compartment (or pressing its button whilst hovering over the display) activates an "Air Command" pie menu which provides shortcuts to pen-oriented features such as Action Memos (on-screen sticky notes that use handwriting recognition to detect their contents and provide relevant actions, such as looking up addresses on Google Maps and dialing phone numbers), Screen Write (an annotation tool), Pen Window (which allows users to draw pop-up windows to run certain apps inside), the search tool S Finder, and Scrapbook. The multi-window functionality has also been carried over with expanded app support, the ability to run multiple instances of a single app, and the ability to drag and drop content between apps. The device also ships with a news aggregator app known as My Magazine, accessible by swiping up from the bottom of the screen, and an updated version of S Note.

Software Upgrades 
All models of Galaxy Note 3 Neo received the Android 5.0 update except Belgian ones in December, 2014.

The Galaxy Note 3 Neo Duos (SM-N7502) never received any OS updates since 2015, till today it is still running the Android 4.4.2 KitKat.

Release 
It was officially announced on February 1, 2014, with a release date starting from March 2014.

See also
 Samsung Galaxy Note series
 Comparison of smartphones

References

Samsung smartphones
Android (operating system) devices
Galaxy Note 3
Galaxy Note 3
Mobile phones introduced in 2014
Discontinued smartphones
3 Neo
Mobile phones with user-replaceable battery